Bodmin St Petroc was an electoral division of Cornwall in the United Kingdom which returned one member to sit on Cornwall Council between 2013 and 2021. It was abolished at the 2021 local elections, being succeeded by the larger Bodmin St Petroc's.

Extent
Bodmin St Petroc represented the east side of Bodmin, the hamlet of Cooksland, and parts of the hamlet of Fletchersbridge (which was shared with Lanivet and Blisland). The division covered 752 hectares in total.

Election results

2017 election

2013 election

References

Electoral divisions of Cornwall Council
Bodmin